Paracallionymus costatus, the ladder dragonet, is a species of dragonet found along the southern coast of Africa from Namibia to Mozambique where it occurs at depths of from .  This species grows to a length of  TL.  This species is the only known member of the genus Paracallionymus.

References

Callionymidae
Monotypic ray-finned fish genera
Taxa named by George Albert Boulenger